Ranai Kota  is the capital of the Natuna Regency archipelago in the Riau Islands, Indonesia. It has one airport and can be reached by boat. It is located on East Bunguran, and East Bunguran has a population of 20,800.

Medical 
There is a hospital, Rumah Sakit Umum Daerah Natuna (RSUD Natuna) located on Jalan Ali Murtopo.

Transport

Air 

Raden Sadjad Airport located in Ranai Kota serves flights to Batam and Tanjungpinang.

Sea 
Ranai Kota also has a port, its name is Port of Penagi.

Climate
Ranai Kota has a tropical rainforest climate (Af) with heavy rainfall year-round.

Religion 
A couple of mosques exist, some being the Nurul Falah Mosque and the Ibnu Salim Mosque. Ranai Kota also has several churches, located not far from the downtown and also airport.

References

Populated places in the Riau Islands
Natuna Regency
Regency seats of the Riau Islands